William Zuehl Conoly (September 13, 1920 – January 22, 2001) was an American football guard who played for one season in the National Football League (NFL) for the Chicago Cardinals. After playing college football for Southwestern and Texas, he was drafted by the Philadelphia Eagles in the tenth round (82nd overall) of the 1943 NFL Draft. He played in nine games for the Cardinals in 1946.

1920 births
2001 deaths
Players of American football from San Antonio
American football guards
Southwestern Pirates football players
Texas Longhorns football players
Chicago Cardinals players